Greenwood (formerly, Long Valley, Green Valley, Lewisville, and Louisville) is an unincorporated community in El Dorado County, California.

The place was originally called Long Valley, then Green Valley, then Lewisville, and finally Greenwood, in honor of John Greenwood who set up a trading post there in 1848.  The Louisville post office operated from 1852 to 1852, when it was moved and renamed to Greenwood. Lewisville and Louisville were names in honor of Lewis B. Meyer, father of the first child born there.

The community is now registered as California Historical Landmark #521.

References

Unincorporated communities in California
Unincorporated communities in El Dorado County, California
Populated places established in 1848
California Historical Landmarks